Ahmed Saleem Thuwaini Al-Mukhaini (born 2 May 1985), commonly known as Ahmed Al-Mukhaini, is an Omani footballer who plays for Al-Oruba  in Oman Professional League.

International career
Ahmed is part of the first team squad of the Oman national football team. He was selected for the national team for the first time in 2014. He made his first appearance for Oman on 31 December 2014 in a friendly match against Sweden.

Club career statistics

Honours

Club
With Al-Oruba
Oman Professional League (1): 2014–15
Sultan Qaboos Cup (1): 2014-15

References

External links

Ahmed Mubarak at Goal.com

Ahmed Salim - ASIAN CUP Australia 2015

1985 births
Living people
People from Abu Dhabi
Emirati people of Omani descent
Omani footballers
Oman international footballers
Association football defenders
2015 AFC Asian Cup players
Al-Orouba SC players
Muscat Club players
Oman Professional League players